Frederick Furner Ward (11 May 1872 – 31 December 1954) was a businessman, socialist, union official and politician in South Australia.

Born in Bowden, South Australia to Eliza née Sheils and Frederick Rousseau Ward a miller. He was educated at state schools before becoming a clerk, accountant and commercial traveller. He rose to be the manager of a timber, iron and furniture business.

A founding member of the South Australian Labor Party, he was a member or official of various trade unions, playing a prominent role in the Port Adelaide Trades and Labor Council and the United Trades and Labor Council. He was elected secretary of the South Australian branch of the Labor Party in 1923 and would hold the role until 1944. In 1931 there was an intense dispute about the handling of the response to the Great Depression in Australia and the Labor Party split into three. The brothers Doug and Ken Bardolph led a breakaway Lang Labor Party, which supported the plan of New South Wales Premier Jack Lang, that successfully contested a by-election in July 1931.  In August 1931 23 of Labor's 30 House of Assembly members and two of Labor's four Legislative Council members were expelled from the party for voting in favour of the Premiers' Plan. Ward became the public face of what remained of the party, supported by the trades and labor council. Membership of the branch dropped from 30,000 to less than 10,000 in the space of three years. Ward himself was financially secure, having become a property owner and landlord, however the experience of the depression saw him shift to the political left and embrace socialism, joining the South Australian Socialist League in 1942 and becoming its secretary.

Ward was defeated as Labor branch secretary in September 1944, his defeat celebrated as a major victory for B. A. Santamaria's Catholic Social Studies Movement.

Ward died in Largs Bay on New Year's Eve 1954, aged 82.

References

Australian Labor Party members of the Parliament of Australia
Members of the Australian Senate for South Australia
Members of the Australian Senate
1873 births
1954 deaths
20th-century Australian politicians